Statistics of Portuguese Liga in the 1961–62 season.

Overview
It was contested by 14 teams, and Sporting Clube de Portugal won the championship.

Details of participants

Details of the 14 participants are provided below:

League standings

Results

Leading scorer
Azumir Veríssimo (Futebol Clube do Porto) was the top scorer of the season with 23 goals.

Promotion and relegation 1962/1963

Relegation to Segunda Divisão
 Beira Mar
 Sporting Covilhã
 Salgueiros

Promotion to Primeira Divisão
 Vitória Setúbal
 Barreirense
 Feirense

Footnotes

External links
 Portugal 1961-62 - RSSSF (Jorge Miguel Teixeira)
 Portuguese League 1960/61 - footballzz.co.uk
 Portugal - Table of Honor - Soccer Library

Primeira Liga seasons
1961–62 in Portuguese football
Portugal